FAB-144 is an indazole-based synthetic cannabinoid that is presumed to be a potent agonist of the CB1 receptor and has been sold online as a designer drug. It is the indazole analogue of XLR-11.

Legal status 

Sweden's public health agency suggested classifying FAB-144 as a hazardous substance on November 10, 2014.

See also
 JWH-018
 STS-135
 UR-144

References

Cannabinoids
Designer drugs
Organofluorides
Indazoles
Cyclopropanes